This is an alphabetical list of 129 baseball players from Mexico who played Major League Baseball between  and .



A

 Juan Acevedo
 Alfredo Aceves
 Cy Acosta
 Mel Almada
 Gabe Alvarez
 Tavo Álvarez
 Víctor Álvarez
 Rubén Amaro
 Alfredo Amézaga
 Víctor Arano
 Beto Ávila
 Luis Ayala

B

 Manny Banuelos
 Salomé Barojas
 Germán Barranca
 Francisco Barrios
 Rigo Beltrán
 Andrés Berumen

C

 Jorge Campillo
 Matías Carrillo
 Vinny Castilla
 Daniel Castro
 Juan Castro
 José Cecena
 Juan Cerros
 Luis Cessa
 Francisco Córdova
 Humberto Cota
 David Cortés
 Luis Cruz

D

 Jorge de la Rosa
 Miguel del Toro
 Elmer Dessens
 Germán Durán
 Erubiel Durazo

E

 Narciso Elvira
 Chico Escárrega
 Francisco Estrada
 Marco Estrada

F

 Héctor Fajardo
 Jesse Flores

G

 Yovani Gallardo
 Giovanny Gallegos
 Jaime García
 Karim García
 Luis García
 Chico García
 Daniel Garibay
 Benji Gil
 Gerónimo Gil
 Chile Gómez
 Luis Gómez
 Édgar González
 Miguel González
 Bob Greenwood

H

 Rudy Hernández
 Bobby Herrera
 Ted Higuera

J

 Germán Jiménez
 Houston Jiménez

J

 Jorge Francisco Meza Alvarez
 Esteban Loaiza

M

 Isidro Meza

O

 Miguel Ojeda
 Jorge Orta
 Antonio Osuna
 Roberto Osuna

P

 Vicente Palacios
 José Peña
 Ramiro Peña
 Óliver Pérez
 Tony Perezchica
 Horacio Piña
 Miguel Puente
 Alfonso Pulido

R

 Roberto Ramírez
 Dennys Reyes
 Gerardo Reyes
 Armando Reynoso
 Ricardo Rincón
 Luis Rivera
 Óscar Robles
 Sergio Robles
 Aurelio Rodríguez
 Carlos Rodríguez
 Francisco Rodríguez
 Rosario Rodríguez
 Enrique Romo
 Vicente Romo
 Jorge Rubio
 Sergio Romo

S

 Fernando Salas
 Celerino Sánchez
 Freddy Sandoval
 José Silva
 Walter Silva
 Alí Solís
 Marcelino Solis
 Joakim Soria

T

 José Tolentino
 Héctor Torres
 Alex Treviño
 Bobby Treviño

U

 Julio Urías
 Luis Urías
 José Urquidy

V

 Ismael Valdez
 Mario Valdez
 Benny Valenzuela
 Fernando Valenzuela
 César Vargas
 Guillermo Velasquez
 Héctor Velázquez
 Christian Villanueva
 Óscar Villarreal

References

External links
Players Born in Mexico - Baseball-Reference.com

 
Baseball, Major League
Mexico